Northchurch is a village and civil parish in the Bulbourne valley in the county of Hertfordshire in the United Kingdom. It lies between the towns of Berkhamsted and Tring.

Situated on the Roman road Akeman Street, a major Roman villa dating from about AD 60 was discovered in the village in the 1970s. The settlement predates the neighbouring larger town of Berkhamsted.

History

Other earlier names for Northchurch include Berkhamsted St. Mary and Berkhamsted Minor. Both names support the view that Northchurch may have been the site of the original Berkhamsted which expanded down the Bulbourne Valley following the construction of Berkhamsted Castle 2 miles to the south west. The village eventually became known as the area around the North Church, St. Mary's lying to the Northwest of the newer Parish Church of St. Peter built to the southeast nearer the Castle.

The parish church of St. Mary dates from Saxon times and is one of the oldest churches in Hertfordshire. Part of the original Saxon building remains in the south and west walls. Flint wall extensions were built between the 11th and 14th centuries, to form a cruciform building.  A stone-faced tower was added over the crossing during the 15th century.  A Victorian north aisle, vestries and south porch were added in the 1880s.

The village stands on both the River Bulbourne and the Grand Union Canal. The main road running through Northchurch, the A4251, is built over Akeman Street, the original Roman road from London (Londinium) to Cirencester (Corinium). The almshouses, or Church House, are two-storey half-timbered houses dating from the 15th and 16th centuries. From 1936 until 1972 Northchurch and Berkhamsted were united under Berkhamsted Urban District Council. Northchurch today, however, is recognised as a separate village with its own Parish Council. 
 
St Mary's churchyard contains the grave of Peter the Wild Boy, a German feral child adopted at the court of King George I and II. His grave can be seen directly outside the main door to the church.

References

 Hastie, Scott, Berkhamsted, an Illustrated History, Alpine Press, 1999,

External links
Northchurch Civil Parish boundaries

Civil parishes in Hertfordshire
Dacorum
Berkhamsted